The bar-winged oriole (Icterus maculialatus) is a species of bird in the family Icteridae. It is found in El Salvador, Guatemala, Honduras, and Mexico.

Its natural habitats are subtropical or tropical moist montane forests and heavily degraded former forest.

References

bar-winged oriole
bar-winged oriole
Birds of El Salvador
Birds of Guatemala
Birds of Mexico
bar-winged oriole
Taxonomy articles created by Polbot